Philippa Baker may refer to:

 Philippa Baker (actress), (born c.1932) Australian retired actress
 Philippa Baker (rower) (born 1963), New Zealand rower and politician